The 2021 Kozerki Open was a professional women's tennis tournament played on outdoor clay courts. It was the second edition of the tournament which was part of the 2021 ITF Women's World Tennis Tour. It took place in Grodzisk Mazowiecki, Poland between 26 July and 1 August 2021.

Singles main-draw entrants

Seeds

 1 Rankings are as of 19 July 2021.

Other entrants
The following players received wildcards into the singles main draw:
  Weronika Baszak
  Ania Hertel
  Anna Kubareva
  Martyna Kubka

The following players received entry from the qualifying draw:
  María Lourdes Carlé
  Andrea Gámiz
  Bárbara Gatica
  Alice Ramé
  Tereza Smitková
  Daniela Vismane

The following players received entry as lucky losers:
  Akgul Amanmuradova
  Jessie Aney
  Amina Anshba
  Valeriia Olianovskaia

Champions

Singles

 Ekaterine Gorgodze def.  Chloé Paquet, 7–6(9–7), 0–6, 6–4

Doubles

  Bárbara Gatica /  Rebeca Pereira def.  Jang Su-jeong /  Lee Ya-hsuan, 6–3, 6–1

References

External links
 2021 Kozerki Open at ITFtennis.com
 Official website

2021 ITF Women's World Tennis Tour
2021 in Polish tennis
July 2021 sports events in Poland
August 2021 sports events in Poland